Mid Cheshire Hospitals NHS Foundation Trust (MCHFT) is an acute hospital trust in Cheshire.  It runs Leighton Hospital in Crewe, Victoria Infirmary in Northwich and Elmhurst Intermediate Care Centre in Winsford. MCHFT became registered as a Foundation Trust on 1 April 2008, following authorisation by the independent regulator, Monitor. The trust is currently under the leadership of chair Dennis Dunn MBE JP DL and chief executive Ian Moston.

Services are provided to a population of approximately 300,000 living in and around Alsager, Crewe, Congleton, Knutsford, Middlewich, Nantwich, Northwich, Sandbach and Winsford. The Trust is registered with the Care Quality Commission (CQC), without conditions, and provides acute, maternity, child health and intermediate care services.

Performance

In October 2014, the Trust and its three sites underwent a comprehensive inspection by the Care Quality Commission.  The report into their findings was published in January 2015, and provided the Trust with an overall rating of "Good".

In March 2015, the Trust's Maternity Unit was named "Midwifery Service of the Year" by the Royal College of Midwives.  This was followed up in May 2015 with Leighton Hospital being awarded full accreditation from UNICEF's Baby Friendly Initiative.

Women having babies at the Trust are provided with some of the safest care in the country, according to an external assessment which awarded the Maternity service the best possible rating. The Clinical Negligence Scheme for Trusts (CNST) awarded the Trust with Level 3 status after scoring 48 out of 50 against indicators which included the care of women in labour, screening of their mental health, whether they are supported to breastfeed, staffing levels, and the number of incidents and complaints.

The Maternity Unit at Leighton Hospital has undergone significant refurbishment works over the past few years, including a fully reconfigured Labour Ward and the introduction of a new Midwifery-Led Unit designed to improve the overall birth experience for low-risk pregnancies. The Trust has been awarded the Baby Friendly Stage 2 accreditation from UNICEF. Baby Friendly focuses on staff knowledge and skills to support families with their infant feeding choices. The work undertaken by the Trust’s Infant Feeding Team has led to improved health outcomes for mothers and their babies, with the highest breast feeding rates and lowest smoking rates during pregnancy in eight years. A national CQC patient survey rated the Trust as better than most others for the labour and birth elements of the pregnancy journey, scoring a total of 9.1 out of 10 (just 0.3 points of the highest score nationally).

In May 2014, the Trust was named as one of the best in the country for the third year in a row in the CHKS 40Top Hospitals award based on the evaluation of 22 key performance indicators and covers important areas such as safety, clinical effectiveness, health outcomes, efficiency, patient experience and quality of care. In 2012, it received the ‘Most Improved Trust in the Country’ award from CHKS, recognising the progress that the staff and services have made in recent years.

In recent years it had been classed as having "higher than expected" mortality rates, and work has been taking place over the past few years to identify and address the causes of this. On 30 July 2014 the Health and Social Care Information Centre published its latest mortality data, with the Trust now back in the "as expected" range for the Summary Hospital-level Mortality Indicator.  The Trust also uses the Risk Adjusted Mortality Index (RAMI). This has improved consistently over the past three years. The latest RAMI figures, covering the 12 months to July 2014, also suggest that the Trust is performing better than the national average.

It was named by the Health Service Journal as one of the top hundred NHS trusts to work for in 2015.  At that time it had 3003 full time equivalent staff and a sickness absence rate of 4.04%. 71% of staff recommend it as a place for treatment and 66% recommended it as a place to work.

Facilities

Spring 2014 saw the first patients treated in the new Theatre suite at Leighton Hospital. Part of the £22.8million project which also saw the creation of a new Critical Care unit, the new Theatres offer opportunities to further develop existing ways of working in a way that will maximise the benefits of new theatre designs such as barn theatres and integrated theatres.

In 2018 the trust applied for £1.4 million in capital funding from NHS Improvement to fund a portable ward next to the A&E department, which is overcrowded, but funding was refused when the trust said this would not lead to a 50% reduction in breaches of the Four Hour Emergency Target over winter.

In 2022 the outstanding maintenance bill was £280 million, the sixth largest in the English NHS.

It is planning a joint electronic patient record system with East Cheshire NHS Trust using Meditech's Expanse, which is cloud based and should operate from 2024.

Relationship with private sector
The Trust uses BMI Healthcare's South Cheshire Hospital to help with elective surgery capacity problems, usually in the winter. The two buildings are connected by a covered corridor. It was announced in February 2019 that the Trust planned to acquire the 32-bed hospital, which stands adjacent to Leighton Hospital, near Crewe.

See also
 List of hospitals in England
 List of NHS trusts

References

NHS foundation trusts
Health in Cheshire